The Crow Tribal General Council, the governing body of the Crow Nation, through the adoption of the 2001 Crow Tribal Constitution, established a three-branch government with a separation of powers.  There is an Executive Branch, Legislative Branch, and Judicial Branch.

The Executive Branch is composed of four independently elected officials (Chairman, Vice-Chairman, Secretary, and Vice-Secretary) and all agencies and departments.  The four elected officials serve concurrent four year terms (term limit of two).

The Legislative Branch is composed of 18 legislators (called "senators" as a matter of courtesy), with three elected in staggered terms from each of the six districts of the Crow Indian Reservation.  The Crow senators serve four year terms with no term limits.

The Judicial Branch is composed of courts established in the Crow Law and Order Code.  Currently, there is a Crow Tribal Court (general jurisdiction), Crow Juvenile Court, and a Crow Court of Appeals.  A Traditional Supreme Court has been established by law but is not yet implemented.  The judges of the Crow Tribal Court are elected to unlimited, four-year terms.

See also
Crow chairperson

References